The Old Settler's Irrigation Ditch, near Rosston, Oklahoma, in both Beaver County, Oklahoma and Harper County, Oklahoma, was constructed during 1893 to 1905.  It was listed on the National Register of Historic Places listings in Beaver County, Oklahoma in 1983.

It enabled Ditch Valley to become a lush green area, in contrast to the surrounding arid lands. It is supplied by water from a diversion dam on the Cimarron River.

References

National Register of Historic Places in Beaver County, Oklahoma
National Register of Historic Places in Harper County, Oklahoma
Buildings and structures completed in 1893